Frost were an Australian pop rock band, which formed in 1997 by Benny Bishop on keyboards, Lee "Lemon" Trevena on lead vocals and Tim "Porn" Powne on bass guitar. They have used several drummers including Jerry Speiser (ex-Men at Work) from 2002 to 2006.

History 

Frost were formed in Melbourne as a pop rock band in February 1997 with Lee "Lemon" Trevena on lead vocals, piano and guitar, Tim "Porn" Powne on bass guitar and backing vocals, and Benny Bishop on keyboards (ex-ABBAration). The band used several drummers since their inception. In 2002 Jerry Speiser (ex-Men at Work, Ross Hannaford's One World) joined on drums.

The band received high rotation on Nova 100 and SBS Television in 2003 for their single "You and Me", which was featured on the SBS and Universal Records CD, The SBS Whatever Sessions and was released on their four-track extended play The Usual Suspects (September 2004). In 2005 they released their debut self-titled album Frost. Their next EP, 10:06, was released in September 2006.

Speiser was replaced by Rohan Heddle (Cordrazine) on drums, until 2008. Frost appeared on the Sound of Melbourne Records release in 2011.

Personnel 

 Benny Bishop – keyboards
 Tim "Porn" Powne – bass guitar, backing vocals
 Lee "Lemon" Trevena – lead vocals, piano, guitar
 Jerry Speiser – drums
 Rohan Heddle – drums
 Rachel Parkinson – drums
 Joe James

Discography

Albums 

 Frost (2005) – Shock Records (LEMR002)

Extended plays 

 The Usual Suspects (12 September 2004) – Lemon Records / MGM Distribution (LEMR001)
 10:06 (16 September 2006) – Lemon Records / Green Records / Waterfront Records (LEMR003)

Other appearances 

 Cheap 'N' Easy - Unleashed (2002) by US company Gold Record Music 
 Independence - Volume One (2003) by Aus company By Design Records & MGM 
 The SBS Whatever Sessions  (2003) by Aus company Special broadcasting Service and Universal Music Aus 
 Sound of Melbourne (2011) by Aus Sound of Melbourne Records

Member histories 

 Lemon: In 1997, Lemon had his song "Here I Go" recorded on the Brian Canham (Pseudo Echo) self-titled debut album Brill. He performed as one half of the acoustic duo Top Deck with Ando McDougell (Dreadnaught), in which they had a residency at the Parkview Hotel in Fitzroy in 2000. In 2006 he wrote the main theme song for a short film titled Passing the Baton, produced by Department for Victorian Communities / Mushroom Marketing. He also worked with Jess McAvoy on her The Women album, released in 2014, and McDermott & North with their 'The Lemon Tape - Vol 1' debut 2018 release.
 Joe James: since leaving Frost has played in numerous cover bands
 Tim 'Porne' Powne: unknown
 Rohan Heddle: was a founding member of Cordrazine. He has played in various jazz groups, one of which was the Mondlarks, which recorded songs at Lemon's home studio in 2013.
 Jerry Speiser: was a founding member of the ARIA Hall of Fame band Men at Work, who won a US Grammy Award in the early 1980s. He continues to play in bands.
 Rachel Parkinson: was a drummer in the band The Mabels, played drums in the all-female band Exploding Daisies in Sydney, and was co-hosting The Comic Box on Channel 31 in Melbourne on Friday nights.
 Benny Bishop: worked at Yamaha Music, has worked in Music theater and was in an ABBA cover band. Currently he is the Music Director at Camberwell Grammar.

References

Australian rock music groups